Jerry Wunderlich (August 18, 1925 – May 14, 1999) was an American set decorator. He was nominated for two Academy Awards in the category Best Art Direction.

Selected filmography
Wunderlich was nominated for two Academy Awards for Best Art Direction:
 The Exorcist (1973)
 The Last Tycoon (1976)

References

External links

1925 births
1999 deaths
People from Los Angeles
American set decorators